The hookjaw moray (Enchelycore bayeri) is a moray eel of the family Muraenidae found throughout the Indo-Pacific.

Like other members of the genus, the hookjaw sports curved jaws and rows of large, glass-like teeth. At two feet in total average length, it is one of the smaller members of the genus.

References

bayeri
Fish described in 1953